Campoverde District is one of the seven districts within the province of Coronel Portillo in Peru.

References

Districts of the Coronel Portillo Province
Districts of the Ucayali Region